Nature therapy, sometimes referred to as ecotherapy, forest therapy, forest bathing, grounding, earthing, Shinrin-Yoku or Sami Lok, is a practice that describes a broad group of techniques or treatments to use nature to improve mental or physical health.

Spending time in nature has various physiological benefits such as relaxation and stress reduction.

History 
In the 6th century BCE, Cyrus the Great planted a garden in the middle of a city to increase human health. In the 16th century CE, Paracelsus wrote: "The art of healing comes from nature, not from the physician." Scientists in the 1950s looked into why people chose to spend time in nature. The term Shinrin-yoku or forest bathing was coined by the head of the Japanese Ministry of Agriculture, Forestry, and Fisheries, Tomohide Akiyama, in 1982 to encourage more visitors to forests.

Health effects

Mood 
120 minutes in nature weekly could improve health and well-being. As little as five minutes in a natural setting, improves mood, self-esteem, and motivation. Nature therapy probably has a benefit in reducing stress and improving a person's mood. People exposed to nature are also more cooperative and pleasant compared to those who are not.

Forest therapy has been linked to some physiological benefits as indicated by neuroimaging and the Profile of mood states psychological test.

Horticulture therapy has been linked to general well-being by boosting positive mood and escaping from daily life stressors.

Stress and depression 
Interaction with nature can decrease stress and depression.
 Forest therapy might help stress management for all age groups.

Social horticulture could help with depression and other mental health problems of PTSD, abuse, lonely elderly people, drug or alcohol addicts, blind people, and other people with special needs.  Nature therapy could also improve self-management, self-esteem, social relations and skills, socio-political awareness and employability. Nature therapy could reduce aggression and improve relationship skills.

This is especially true due to the mental health damage COVID-19 brought. Nature therapy had significant results when it came to reducing stress, anxiety, and depression influenced by COVID-19.

Other possible benefits 
Nature therapy could help with general medical recovery, pain reduction, Attention Deficit/Hyperactivity Disorder, dementia, obesity, and vitamin D deficiency. Interactions with nature environments enhance social connections, stewardship, sense of place, and increase environmental participation. Connecting with nature also addresses needs such as intellectual capacity, emotional bonding, creativity, and imagination. Overall, there seems to be benefits to time spent in nature including memory, cognitive flexibility, and attention control.

Research also suggests that childhood experience in nature are crucial for children in their daily lives as it contributes to several developmental outcomes and various domains of their well-being. Essentially, these experiences also foster an intrinsic care for nature.

Criticism 
A 2012 systematic review study showed inconclusive results related to the methodology used in studies. Spending time in forests demonstrated positive health effects, but not enough to generate clinical practice guidelines or demonstrate causality. Additionally, there are concerns from researchers expressing that time spent in nature as a form of regenerative therapy is highly personal and entirely unpredictable. Nature can be harmed in the process of human interaction.

Grounding 

Grounding, or earthing, is a pseudoscientific practice that involves people grounding themselves using devices by touching the earth or removing shoes. People who ground themselves believe that they have been exposed to high levels of electromagnetic radiation. Possible changes in mood could be due to a placebo effect.

Governmental support 
In Finland, researchers recommend five hours a month in nature to reduce depression, alcoholism, and suicide.  Forest therapy has state-backing in Japan. South Korea has a nature therapy program for firefighters with post-traumatic stress disorder. Canadian physicians can also "prescribe nature" to patients with mental and physical health problems encouraging them to get into nature more.

References 

Therapy
Forestry
Fringe science
Pseudoscience